Lumbinī ("the lovely") is a Buddhist pilgrimage site in the Rupandehi District of Lumbini Province in Nepal. It is the place where, according to Buddhist tradition, Queen Mahamayadevi gave birth to Siddhartha Gautama at around 566 BCE. Gautama, who, according to Buddhist tradition, achieved Enlightenment some time around 528 BCE, became Gautama Buddha and founded Buddhism. Lumbini is one of many magnets for pilgrimage that sprang up in places pivotal to the life of the Buddha.

Lumbini has a number of older temples, including the Mayadevi Temple, and various new temples, funded by Buddhist organisations from various countries, have been completed or are still under construction. Many monuments, monasteries and a museum, and the Lumbini International Research Institute are also within the holy site. Also, there is the Puskarini, or Holy Pond, where the Buddha's mother took the ritual dip prior to his birth and where he had his first bath. At other sites near Lumbini, earlier Buddhas were, according to tradition, born, then achieved ultimate Enlightenment and finally relinquished their earthly forms. The Government of Bangladesh is currently constructing a major Buddhist Monastery in Lumbhini.

Lumbini was made a World Heritage Site by UNESCO in 1997.

In Buddha's time
In the Buddha's time, Lumbini was situated in east of Kapilavastu and southwest Devadaha of Shakya, an oligarchic republic. According to Buddhist tradition, it was there that the Buddha was born. A pillar discovered at Rupandehi in 1896 is believed to mark the spot of Ashoka's visit to Lumbini. The site was not known as Lumbini before the pillar was discovered. The translation of Inscription reads:  "When King Devanampriya Priyadarsin had been anointed twenty years, he came himself and worshipped (this spot) because the Buddha Shakyamuni was born here. (He) both caused to be made a stone bearing a horse (?) and caused a stone pillar to be set up, (in order to show) that the Blessed One was born here. (He) made the village of Lumbini free of taxes, and paying (only) an eighth share (of the produce)." The park was previously known as Rupandehi, 2 mi north of Bhagavanpura.

The Sutta Nipáta (vs. 683) states that the Buddha was born in a village of the Sákyans in the Lumbineyya Janapada. The Buddha stayed in Lumbinívana during his visit to Devadaha and there preached the Devadaha Sutta.

Pillar of Ashoka

In 1896, former Commander-In-Chief of the Nepalese Army General Khadga Shamsher Jang Bahadur Rana and Alois Anton Führer discovered a great stone pillar at Rupandehi, according to the crucial historical records made by the ancient Chinese monk-pilgrim Xuanzang in the 7th century CE and by another ancient Chinese monk-pilgrim Faxian in the early 5th century CE. 
The Brahmi inscription on the pillar gives evidence that Ashoka, emperor of the Maurya Empire, visited the place in 3rd-century BCE and identified it as the birth-place of the Buddha. The inscription was translated by Paranavitana:

At the top of the pillar, there is a second inscription by king Ripumalla (13-14th century CE), who is also known from an inscription at the Nigali Sagar pillar:

A second pillar of Ashoka is located about 22 kilometers to the northwest of Lumbini, the Nigali Sagar pillar (with inscription), and a third one 24 kilometers to the west, the Gotihawa pillar (without inscription).

Excavation at the Mayadevi Temple in 2013

According to Robin Coningham, excavations beneath existing brick structures at the Mayadevi Temple at Lumbini provide evidence for an older timber structure beneath the walls of a brick Buddhist shrine built during the Ashokan era (3rd-century BCE). The layout of the Ashokan shrine closely follows that of the earlier timber structure, which suggests a continuity of worship at the site. The pre-Mauryan timber structure appears to be an ancient tree shrine. Radiocarbon dating of charcoal from the wooden postholes and optically stimulated luminescence dating of elements in the soil suggests human activity began at Lumbini around 1000 BCE. The site, states Coningham, may be a Buddhist monument from 6th-century BCE. Other scholars state that the excavations revealed nothing that is Buddhist, and they only confirm that the site predates the Buddha.

Lumbini complex 
The holy site of Lumbini is bordered by a large monastic zone in which only monasteries can be built, no shops, hotels or restaurants. It is separated into an eastern and western monastic zone, the eastern having the Theravadin monasteries, the western having Mahayana and Vajrayana monasteries. There is a long water filled canal separating the western and eastern zones, with a series of brick arch bridges joining the two sides along the length. The canal is serviced by simple outboard motor boats at the north end which provides tours.The holy site of Lumbini has ruins of ancient monasteries, a sacred Bodhi tree, an ancient bathing pond, the Ashokan pillar and the Mayadevi Temple, a site traditionally considered to be the birthplace of the Buddha. From early morning to early evening, pilgrims from various countries perform chanting and meditation at the site.

Lumbini complex is divided into three areas: the Sacred Garden, the Monastic Zone and the Cultural Center and New Lumbini Village. The Sacred Garden remains the epicenter of the Lumbini area and consists of the birthplace of Buddha and other monuments of archaeological and spiritual importance such as the Mayadevi Temple, the Ashoka Pillar, the Marker Stone, the Nativity Sculpture, Puskarini Sacred Pond and other structural ruins of Buddhist stupas and viharas. The Monastic Zone, spanning an area of 1 square mile is divided into two zones: the East Monastic Zone which represents Theravada school of Buddhism and the West Monastic Zone which represents Mahayana and Vajrayana school of Buddhism, with their respective monasteries on the either side of a long pedestrian walkway and canal. Marking the monastic spot as a sacred pilgrimage site, many countries have established Buddhist stupas and monasteries in the monastic zone with their unique historical, cultural and spiritual designs.The Cultural Center and New Lumbini Village comprises Lumbini Museum, Lumbini International Research Institute, World Peace Pagoda of Japan, Lumbini Crane Sanctuary and other administrative offices.

Other developments
Nepal's central bank has introduced a 100-rupee Nepali note featuring Lumbini, the birthplace of Buddha. The Nepal Rastra Bank said the new note would be accessible only during the Dashain, Nepal's major festival in the time of September/October. It displays the portrait of Mayadevi, Gautam Buddha's mother in silver metallic on the front. The note also has a black dot which would help the blind recognise the note. The name of the central bank in Latin script would be printed on the note along with the date of printing in both the Christian Era and the Bikram Era. The new note is being issued following a cabinet decision 27 August.

Nipponzan Myohoji decided to build a Peace Pagoda in the park in 2001, which is visited by many different cultures and religions every day. Because some Hindus regard the Buddha as an incarnation of Vishnu, thousands of Hindus have begun to come here on pilgrimage during the full moon of the Nepali month of Baisakh (April–May) to worship Queen Mayadevi as Rupa Devi, the mother goddess of Lumbini. Lumbini was granted World Heritage status by UNESCO in 1997.

A non-governmental organisation named Samriddhi Foundation started working in 2013 in the fields of education and health, particularly in government schools in the area where underprivileged children study. A non-governmental organisation called "Asia Pacific Exchange and Co-operation Foundation" (APECF) backed by chairman of the Unified Communist Party of Nepal (Maoist) and then Prime Minister Prachanda, the Chinese government and a UN group called "United Nations Industrial Development Organization" (UNIDO) signed a deal to develop Lumbini into a "special development zone" with funds worth $3 billion. The venture was a China-UN joint project. A broader 'Lumbini Development National Director Committee' under the leadership of Pushpa Kamal Dahal was formed on 17 October 2011. The six-member committee included Communist Party of Nepal (Unified Marxist-Leninist) leader Mangal Siddhi Manandhar, Nepali Congress leader Minendra Rijal, Forest Minister Mohammad Wakil Musalman, among other leaders. The committee was given the authority to "draft a master plan to develop Lumbini as a peaceful and tourism area and table the proposal" and the responsibility to gather international support for the same.

Tourism
In 2019, Lumbini received 1.5 million visitors across the world.

Transport
Lumbini is a 10-hour drive from Kathmandu and a 30-minute drive from Bhairahawa. The closest airport is Gautam Buddha Airport at Bhairahawa, with flights to and from Kathmandu. The India border town of Sonauli in Maharajganj district is 1 hour drive from Lumbini and Nautanwa railway station in India is just a few kilometres away. The nearest big city is Gorakhpur, which is about 100 km and is 4 hours drive from Lumbini.

Places to visit
 Maya Devi Temple
 World Peace Pagoda, Lumbini
 Ashoka Pillar
 Lumbini Crane Sanctuary

New hotel construction
The nearest airport to Lumbini, Gautam Buddha Airport in Bhairahawa, is currently undergoing expansion. This small domestic airport is soon expected to become an international airport, with latest deadline set for 2019. The airport expansion attracted investors and hoteliers, and a series of new hotels are being constructed in and around Lumbini, hoping to cash in on the expected international tourist boom once the airport expansion work is completed.

Sister cities
Lumbini has three official sister cities:
 Kushinagar, India (2022)
 Bodh Gaya, India
 Cáceres, Spain

See also
 Bodh Gaya
 Sarnath
 Kushinagar
 Maya Devi Temple, Lumbini
 Lumbini Buddhist University
 Lumbini Development Trust
 Lumbini pillar inscription
 Pillars of Ashoka
 Ramagrama stupa
 Kindo Baha
 Pranidhipurna Mahavihar
 Rajgir
 World Peace Pagoda
 List of stupas in Nepal
 List of Buddshist monasteries in Nepal

Notes

References

Further reading

Bibliography

External links

 Lumbini On Trial: The Untold Story
 
 Lumbini at the Open Directory Project
 Lumbini at WorldHeritageSite.org Listing

Buddhist pilgrimage sites in Nepal
Populated places in Rupandehi District
World Heritage Sites in Nepal
Rupandehi District
Buddhist archaeological sites
Archaeological sites in Nepal
Cultural heritage of Nepal